

The 9th Luftwaffe Field Division was an infantry division of the Luftwaffe branch of the Wehrmacht that fought in World War II. It was formed using surplus ground crew of the Luftwaffe and served on the Eastern Front from late 1942 to June 1944. It was badly mauled during the Soviet offensive of January 1944 near Leningrad. It was later merged with the 225th Infantry Division.

Operational history

The 9th Luftwaffe Field Division, one of several such divisions of the Luftwaffe (German Air Force), was formed in October 1942 in Eastern  Prussia, in the Arys Troop Maneuver Area, under the command of Oberst Hans Erdmann. Intended to serve as infantry, its personnel were largely drawn from the 62nd Air Regiment. In December 1942, it was assigned to Army Group North on the Eastern Front. Posted to a sector near Leningrad, it defended its frontlines for over 12 months.

Commanders
Oberst Hans Erdmann (October 1942–September 1943);
Oberst Anton-Carl Longin (September–November 1943);
Generalleutnant Paul Winter (November 1943);  
Oberst Ernst Michael (November 1943–January 1944); 
Oberst Heinrich Geerkens (January 1944).

Notes
Footnotes

Citations

References

0*009
Military units and formations established in 1942
Military units and formations disestablished in 1944